Jaan Rannap (born September 1931) is an Estonian children's writer and track-and-field athlete.

Raanap was born in Halliste. His father was a teacher Jaan Rannap, his brother is a music teacher and pedagogical scientist Heino Rannap and his nephew is musician Rein Rannap. In 1956 he graduated from Tallinn Pedagogical Institute with a degree in of mathematics and physics. Since 1952 he worked at the children's magazine Säde, and 1955-1977 at the magazine Pioneer. Since 1977 he was a senior editor of the children's magazine Täheke.

He has written stories about nature and animal, especially notable are his humorous school-related stories.

Awards:
 2010: Order of the White Star, IV class.

Works

 Roheline pall (1962)
 Salu Juhan ja ta sõbrad (1964)
 Spordilood (1966)
 Viimane valgesulg (1967)
 collection Musta lamba matused (1968)
 Topi (1970)
 Jefreitor Jõmm (1971)
 Nublu (1972)

References

Living people
1931 births
Estonian children's writers
Estonian male writers
Recipients of the Order of the White Star, 4th Class
Tallinn University alumni
People from Mulgi Parish
20th-century Estonian writers